The Nissan Z, known in Japan as the , is the seventh generation of the Z-car line of sports cars manufactured by Nissan. The model succeeded the 370Z, though is built on a modified and revised version of the previous generation's platform. The model also drops the numerical nomenclature of the previous generations.

The seventh-generation of the Z-car was introduced in August, 2021, the car uses Nissan's VR30DDTT engine and built on an evolution of Nissan FM Z34 platform, reason being codenamed as, "RZ34".



History 

In 2018, the seventh-generation Nissan Z was first hinted at by Alfonso Albaisa, Senior Vice President for Global Design of Nissan, confirmed to Australian automotive magazine WhichCar that a direct successor to the Nissan 370Z was in development. On March 19, 2020, Nissan filed a trademark for a new version of the Z-car logo. On May 28, 2020, as part of Nissan's global restructuring plan, named "Nissan Next", Nissan's official YouTube channel released a short video showcasing its updated vehicle lineup, including the new Z-car; this video also confirmed that the new Z-car would have retro styling, with its overall shape and circular running lights referencing the 240Z. On September 15, 2020, Nissan revealed the prototype version called the "Nissan Z Proto Concept".

Production 

The production model Z was foreshadowed by the Z Proto concept, which was presented on September 15, 2020. The production version of the Z was unveiled on August 17, 2021, at New York City by Nissan's official YouTube channel, and the car was presented by Cody Walker (brother of Paul Walker). The production model comes in two trim levels: Z Sport (Fairlady Z Version S in Japan) and Z Performance (Fairlady Z Version ST in Japan). The production of the new Z, began in April 2022, sales to begin in June 2022. In April 2022, Nissan announced worldwide deliveries of the Z will be delayed until mid 2022, due to the impact of the supply parts.

Nissan announced the Z will not be available for the European market including United Kingdom, due to strict emissions and noise regulations. The Z was sold only in the Japanese, North American, Australian and other non-european markets. pricing for the Japanese market announced in April 2022. The base version S (Sport version) starting at ¥5,241,500 (US$41,081 as of current exchange rates). The version ST (Performance version) starting at ¥6,462,500 (US$50,650 as of current exchange rates). United States pricings also announced, starting at US$41,015 for the Sport version, US$51,015 for the Performance version.

Z Proto Launch Edition 

After the unveiling of the Z, Nissan announced that a manual transmission-only launch edition will be introduced before the production model. Named the Z Proto Launch Edition, it will be limited to 240 units and have the same features as the Nissan Z Proto concept, including the black and yellow exterior color tone, bronze wheels with yellow brake calipers, black seats with yellow stitching and accents, and a yellow shift knob. The Z Proto Launch Edition also features yellow stitching throughout the cabin, suede and cloth door trim panels and Proto Spec badging.

Fairlady Z Customized Proto
At the 2022 Tokyo Auto Salon, Nissan unveiled a one-off prototype named Fairlady Z Customized Proto. Which is slightly different than the Z Proto Launch Edition. Nissan stated they introduced this Proto to honor its predecessors heritage. Also, stated "gauge customer and fan interest for potential future accessory offerings".

This Fairlady Z Customized Proto features a new  orange body color, split front grille, black eight-spoke wheels with "Nissan Z" badged tires, black graphics package with black roof, accents and stripes, front fender flares and carbon-fiber front splitter and side skirts. No technical changes have been made from the production version Z.

Z Performance 

This trim also has the same 6-speed manual transmission and 9-speed automatic transmission. This trim retains all the features and upgrades of the base Sport trim as well as other new features.

Other upgrades includes: SynchroRev Match and a rev-matching system for manual transmission models, GT-R-inspired paddle shifters with launch control for automatic transmission models, an even sportier suspension setup over the Sport trim, larger brake rotors with 14.0-inch for the front and 13.8-inch in the rear and also red floating aluminum calipers with four-piston up front and two-piston for the back. For the Performance trim Nissan also offers a mechanical clutch-type limited-slip differential, 19-inch Rays super lightweight forged alloy wheels with Bridgestone Potenza S007 high performance street tires, front and rear spoilers to improve downforce, sports dual exhaust outlets, heated leather seats with four-way power-adjustable, 9.0-inch infotainment touchscreen with navigation, NissanConnect services and eight-speaker Bose audio system.

Specifications 

The Nissan Z uses the same platform, manual transmission and architecture as the 370Z while making use of a nine-speed automatic transmission used previously in other cars like the Nissan Frontier. "To be honest, [for] around 80 per cent of the body we changed the parts. [However], carryover of parts is very important for us and carryover means reality of affordability so you will be able to enjoy some affordability," said Hiroshi Tamura, chief product specialist of the Nissan Z to Australian publication CarExpert about the part sharing with the 370Z.

The Nissan Z (base Sport trim known as Fairlady Z Version S in Japan) uses the same VR30DDTT engine as Infiniti Red Sport 400 models (as well as the Nissan Skyline 400R V37 in Japan), and the same FM Platform as previous generation Nissan Z vehicles. Manual transmission models get a carbon-fiber driveshaft, an EXEDY performance clutch, and automatic transmission models get a rev-matching system on downshifts and aluminum paddle shifters.

Transmission 
The Z has a 6-speed manual transmission like previous generation Z vehicles. Also offered is an optional 9-speed Mercedes-Benz 9G-Tronic automatic transmission with launch control, manufactured under license of Jatco and re-branded as "JR913E".

Interior 
The interior was designed with help of Nismo's SuperGT GT500 class racing driver, Tsugio Matsuda.  In the interior is a customizable 12.3-inch TFT instrument display, programmable shift indicator, three analog gauges that show turbocharger boost, turbocharger tach (rpm), and battery voltage (which are perched on top of the dash, angled towards the driver), manually adjustable sport bucket seats similar to those found in the Nissan GT-R and can be adjusted eight-way for the driver side and four-way on the passenger side. Cloth seats with synthetic suede inserts, and a full cadre of safety nannies and driver-assistance gear are also offered.

The customers can choose the interior color in Black, Red, or Blue colors. On the interior, Nissan also offers is an 8.0-inch touchscreen infotainment system with navigation and NissanConnect Services, six-speaker Bose audio system with active noise cancellation and active sound enhancement. Standard safety and tech includes: lane departure warning, automatic braking with pedestrian detection, Apple CarPlay and Android Auto and Intelligent Cruise Control.

Exterior 

The Nissan Z is available with three monotone exterior paint options, and six two-tone schemes. Included in the monotone options are Black Diamond Metallic, Gun Metallic, and Rosewood Metallic. The two-tone options pair a Super Black roof with the following colors: Brilliant Silver, Boulder Gray, Seiran Blue, Ikazuchi Yellow, Passion Red TriCoat, or Everest White Pearl TriCoat. Also featured are dual body-colored side mirrors with integrated LED turn signals. The hood, doors, and hatchback are all made of lightweight aluminum.

Suspension, brakes and wheels 
The suspension setup of the new Z has double-wishbone aluminum suspension with increased caster angle on the front, improving straight-line tracking and high-speed stability. A front strut tower brace stiffens up the front structure and a rear multilink suspension has been offered. It also comes with even wider tires than the 370Z, larger diameter monotube shocks, and enhanced body rigidity to help improve cornering. , Nissan offered 12.6-inch rotors for the front and 12.1-inch units for the rear, gripped by the fixed two-piston front calipers and single-piston rear calipers. The Z has 18-inch aluminum alloy wheels with Yokohama Advan tires.

Performance 

Motorsports

Super GT 

The Z GT500 was unveiled in December 2021, at Fuji Speedway, it was slated to compete in the 2022 Super GT season for the first time in 15 years, replacing the Nissan GT-R GT500, which had been in run for 13 seasons in the Super GT series. The Z GT500 made its racing debut at 2022 Super GT season's Okayama GT 300km round. The car scored its first podium finish in its debut race, as Team Nismo's #23 car, driven by Tsugio Matsuda, made an impressive late charge to climb up to the podium place despite starting 9th on the grid. In the third race of the season at Suzuka International Racing Course, the Z GT500 scored its first race win with team NDDP Racing, driven by Katsumasa Chiyo and Mitsunori Takaboshi, both drivers currently leading the championship with only one race to go. For their final race at Mobility Resort Motegi, the Calsonic Impul Z qualified third while NDDP Racing qualified fourth. On race day, the NDDP Z incurred a drive-through penalty early on so Chiyo and Takaboshi had to fight from 12th to ultimately finish 4th. NDDP Racing came in 2nd for the championship standings as Team Impul eclipsed them in the series ranking with a 2nd place finish during the final round. The #12 Calsonic Impul Z, driven by Kazuki Hiramine/Bertrand Baguette, was crowned champion for the 2022 season.

Z Racing Concept 

In June 2022, Nissan introduced the Z Racing Concept at 2022 Super Taikyu Series, 24 hours of Fuji round. Two of these racing concepts were entered the race, to aid development of Z's future racing programs and Nissan's carbon-neutral fuel (CNF) compatible engine. Both cars entered the race as non-championship contenders with numbers, 230 and 244. The car 230 was entered by team Nismo, equipped with a CNF compatible engine, the car 244 was entered by Max Racing, equipped with a internal combustion engine (ICE). Additionally, both cars were fitted with a different aero package, compared to the standard Z. Both cars, successfully finished the race.

SRO GT4

Z Nismo GT4 
GT4 class version of the Z was introduced on September 28, 2022, via online platforms. It is the successor of the Z33 and Z34 models that competed in the earliest seasons of SRO's GT4 European series. And joins a long line of customer GT racecars built by Nissan, including the GT2 spec Z33 that raced in the FIA GT Championship and British GT with Team RJN and the GT1 and GT3 competitions with the Nissan GT-R. The Z GT4 was developed by Nissan's motorsport arm, Nismo. In results, some upgrades were done to the road going Z. Including; minor upgrades to the VR30DDTT engine, optimized chassis and suspension for competitive racing and track driving, an aerodynamic package; which includes, a front splitter with canards and GT4-inspired strut-supported rear wing. Other GT4 race car changes; such as the fire suppression system, weight reduction and safety equipments such as a roll cage were also fitted to the car.

Nissan claimed, this particular car was an evolution of the Z Racing Concept, which was used in the 2022 Super Taikyu Series, Fuji 24 hour race earlier in June, 2022. The Z GT4 is expected to compete in Michelin Pilot Challenge and GT4 America Series. The car would make its physical debut at the SEMA Auto Show in November, 2022 and deliveries to begin in the first half of 2023.

Awards and recognition 

Motor Magazine named the Z as "Most Exciting New Car" of 2021, ahead of cars such as, Porsche Cayman GT4 RS and Toyota GR86. The Z won the Good Design Award under Product Design category at Australian Good Design Awards, the Award Jury praised Z's design, said "A clever and professional evolution of an icon", as the design of the Z pays homage for its predecessors, while also having a modern and fresh interpretation.

References

External links 

  (Japan)

Z (Z34)
Cars introduced in 2021
Sports cars
Coupés
Rear-wheel-drive vehicles
Retro-style automobiles